Alejandra Bernabé de Santiago (born 12 November 2001) is a Spanish professional footballer who plays as a left back for Liga F club Real Sociedad, on loan from same league side Atlético Madrid, and the Spain women's national team.

Club career
Bernabé started her career at Madrid CFF youth ranks.

International career
Bernabé represents Spain. She won the 2018 UEFA Women's Under-17 Championship and made her senior debut on 11 November 2022, being a 47th-minute substitution in a 7-0 friendly home win over Argentina.

References

External links
Profile at La Liga

2001 births
Living people
Footballers from Madrid
Spanish women's footballers
Women's association football defenders
Madrid CFF players
Atlético Madrid Femenino players
SD Eibar Femenino players
Primera División (women) players
Segunda Federación (women) players
Spain women's youth international footballers
Spain women's international footballers
21st-century Spanish women